U.S. Route 36 (US 36) in the state of Missouri is an expressway with many freeway sections, connecting Kansas to Illinois. From Cameron to the Illinois state line, it forms part of the principal route between Kansas City and Chicago, known as the Chicago–Kansas City Expressway.

All of US 36 in Missouri is named the V.F.W. Memorial Highway.

Route description
U.S. Route 36 in Missouri runs from the Pony Express Bridge over the Missouri River in St. Joseph to the Mark Twain Memorial Bridge over the Mississippi River in Hannibal. 
After leaving the Missouri River valley, U.S. 36 then links major cities in Northern Missouri with Kansas City and cities in the east. From Cameron to the Illinois state line, it is overlapped with Route 110, also known as the Chicago–Kansas City Expressway. Starting in St. Joseph, it passes through the cities of Cameron, Hamilton, Chillicothe, Macon, Shelbina, Monroe City, and Brookfield. The final  of US 36 in Missouri is concurrent with I-72. The route passes through mostly flat, fertile, productive farmland. Even though there are some surface intersections, U.S. 36 has many grade-separated interchanges and town bypasses that suggest a future extension of I-72 west from Hannibal.

History
US 36 across Missouri parallels the route of the Hannibal and St. Joseph Railroad, which was the reason St. Joseph was selected for the Pony Express.  The two towns were the second and third largest cities in the State of Missouri prior to the American Civil War.  Prior to the establishment of the railroad in the late 1850s, the stagecoach route was called the "Hound Dog Trail."

The road was originally Route 8 from 1922 to 1926, before being designated as US 36. Over the years some busier sections were upgraded to four lanes. On August 3, 2005, residents of Macon, Marion, Monroe, Shelby, and Ralls counties approved Proposition 36B, which excluded Ralls County from the Transportation Development District, and allowed for a 4-lane US 36 to be constructed without Ralls County's participation. In June 2010 work was completed making US 36 a four-lane highway across the entire state, saving considerable travel time.

Future

Presently I-72 ends at US 61 (Avenue of the Saints) in Hannibal, but further lengthening is proposed by Marion County. The five-item transportation list finalized by the County Commission on February 16, 2016, added the upgrade of US 36, from the Mark Twain Memorial Bridge across the Mississippi River to the split of US 24 and US 36 near Rocket Plaza, as a new priority.

Major intersections

Special routes

References

External links

 Missouri
36
Expressways in the United States
Transportation in Buchanan County, Missouri
Transportation in DeKalb County, Missouri
Transportation in Caldwell County, Missouri
Transportation in Livingston County, Missouri
Transportation in Linn County, Missouri
Transportation in Macon County, Missouri
Transportation in Shelby County, Missouri
Transportation in Marion County, Missouri
Transportation in Ralls County, Missouri